Ranen Barman (born 2 March 1969) is a member of the 14th Lok Sabha of India. He represented the Balurghat constituency of West Bengal and is a member of the Revolutionary Socialist Party (RSP) political party.

External links
 Official biographical sketch in Parliament of India website

Living people
1969 births
People from Dakshin Dinajpur district
Tripuri people
India MPs 2004–2009
Revolutionary Socialist Party (India) politicians
India MPs 1996–1997
India MPs 1998–1999
India MPs 1999–2004
Lok Sabha members from West Bengal